Adolfo Ibáñez Gutiérrez (November 28, 1827 - August 12, 1898) was a Chilean political figure, who served as minister and diplomat.

He was born in Santiago, the son of Gregorio Ibáñez Salces and of Mercedes Gutiérrez de Miers. After completing his studies in his native city, he graduated as a lawyer from the Universidad de Chile on January 9, 1852. He was appointed in 1853 District Attorney for the Appeals Court of La Serena, and in 1855 judge of the Court of Ancud. He was also Judge in Valparaíso. Ibáñez married Josefina Rondizzoni de la Cotera and together they had 9 children.

In 1870 he was sent by President José Joaquín Pérez as minister (ambassador) to Peru, and to him was due the satisfactory arrangement of some differences that had arisen out of the treaty of alliance which the two republics had formed against Spain during the Chincha Islands War. He returned to Chile in 1871 when President Federico Errázuriz Zañartu appointed him as Minister of Foreign Affairs and Colonization, and in this office he brought the question of the boundary between his country and Bolivia to a conclusion, and began the claims against the Argentina regarding the territory of Patagonia. He also fostered colonization, and succeeded in attracting a steady current of emigration, he was elected deputy in 1874 for the city of Santiago, and in 1876 to the senate for the province of that name.

In 1875, he was sent as plenipotentiary minister to the United States, where he successfully concluded a special mission, in 1879 he returned to Chile, resuming his seat in the senate, where he contributed greatly to the favorable termination of the war between Chile and Peru. In 1890 he was called by President José Manuel Balmaceda to take charge of the portfolio of the Interior, but in the same year was elected senator for the province of Santiago for the full term of six years.

After the 1891 Chilean Civil War, he was exiled to Buenos Aires, where he lived for four years before being allowed to return. He died in his home in Santiago,  at the age of 71.

External links
Official biographical sketch 

1827 births
1898 deaths
People from Santiago
Chilean people of Spanish descent
Liberal Party (Chile, 1849) politicians
Chilean Ministers of the Interior
Foreign ministers of Chile
Senators of the XVIII Legislative Period of the National Congress of Chile
Senators of the XIX Legislative Period of the National Congress of Chile
Senators of the XX Legislative Period of the National Congress of Chile
Senators of the XXI Legislative Period of the National Congress of Chile
Senators of the Constituent Congress of Chile (1891)
Ambassadors of Chile to Peru
Ambassadors of Chile to the United States
Chilean diplomats
University of Chile alumni
People of the Chilean Civil War of 1891 (Balmacedistas)
Chilean exiles